The Appalachian State Mountaineers men's basketball team is the college basketball team at Appalachian State University in Boone, North Carolina. The Mountaineers compete in the Sun Belt Conference after having competed in the Southern Conference from 1972 to 2014. They are currently a Division I member of the National Collegiate Athletic Association (NCAA). Appalachian State plays their home games at the George M. Holmes Convocation Center.

Notable past coaches include Buzz Peterson, Press Maravich, and Bobby Cremins. The Mountaineers have appeared in the NCAA tournament three times, 1979, 2000, and 2021. They also appeared in the National Invitation Tournament in 2007. The Mountaineers also reached the semifinals of the 2010 CollegeInsider.com Postseason Tournament.

Conference championships

Regular Season

Conference Tournament Champions

Postseason results

NCAA tournament results
The Mountaineers have appeared in the NCAA tournament three times. Their combined record is 0–3.

National Invitation Tournament results
The Mountaineers have appeared in the National Invitation Tournament one time. Their record is 0–1.

CollegeInsider.com results
The Mountaineers have appeared in the CollegeInsider.com Postseason Tournament one time. Their record is 2–1.

The Basketball Classic results
The Mountaineers have appeared in The Basketball Classic one time. Their record is 0–1.

NAIA tournament results
The Mountaineers have appeared in the NAIA Tournament five times. Their combined record is 5–5.

Coaching history

Rivalries
Appalachian's primary basketball rivals are the East Tennessee State Buccaneers and the Georgia Southern Eagles. Appalachian State is only 55 miles from Johnson City, TN. East Tennessee State has dominated the series over the past two decades, winning 14 games and losing 3. After being highly competitive in Division I-AA Southern Conference from the late 1990s to the late 2000s, Appalachian State and Georgia Southern have rekindled a rivalry series in the Sun Belt conference. Since the transition in 2014, the Mountaineers are 6-7 against the Eagles, winning each of the last four meetings.

Mountaineers in the NBA
One former Appalachian State player has played in the NBA.

NBA Draft
Five former Appalachian State players have been drafted into the NBA.

References

External links
 

 
Basketball teams established in 1919